are the often non-standard kanji character readings (pronunciations) found almost exclusively in Japanese names.

In the Japanese language, many Japanese names are constructed from common characters with standard pronunciations. However, names may also contain rare characters which only occur as parts of names, or use non-standard readings of common characters. Often, the readings used are so esoteric that they cannot even be found in dictionaries. However, as a female name, it can be pronounced Nozomi.

In compounds, nanori readings can be used in conjunction with other readings, such as in the name Iida. The second character  is read using its standard kun'yomi reading, . Often (as in the previous example), the nanori reading is related to the general meaning of the kanji, as it is frequently an old-fashioned way to read the character that has since fallen into disuse.

See also
 On'yomi, readings of kanji based on Chinese pronunciation
 Kun'yomi, readings of kanji based on Japanese pronunciation

References

Kanji
Japanese writing system terms
Japanese names